Shyamchi Aai is an autobiography of social activist Pandurang Sadashiv Sane (known as Sane Guruji). Its regarded as one of the greatest tributes to mother's love in Marathi literature.

Story
Shyamchi Aai is an autobiography  of Sane Guruji belonging to a Brahmin family in Konkan region of rural Maharashtra during British Raj. Sane Guruji (now an adult), fondly called Shyam during his childhood, is narrating his memories to a group of children in a nightly sitting.

Chapters in the book are named ratra meaning "night" in Marathi. They are named first night, second night, and so on. Every passing 5, the story takes you into the family setting in rural Konkan and its beautiful seaside landscapes with adjoining ranges of Sahyadri. This book is a representation of the love of a mother for her child.

As the title suggests the central character is Shyam's mother and the kind of enormous influence she has on Shyam's life and upbringing. It involves sticking to one's ideals even though one is neck-deep in abject poverty.

The narration is flamboyant and involves readers in the setting smoothly. As the story progresses, we come to know the deterioration of Shyam's debt-ridden family. The communication between father and son, mother and son, and siblings is exemplary. It shows that if love is present in a person's life, the person can be content; no matter how poor he is.

The book starts with Shyam's mother getting married into a wealthy family, its slow progression into debt-ridden poverty, and ends with the illness and death of his mother.

In popular culture
The story was adapted into a film with the same title. The film was directed and produced by noted writer, poet, and educationist Acharya Atre himself. It won President's Medal as Best Feature Film at the 1st National Film Awards ceremony.

The story is also adapted for stage dramas in Marathi. In 2012, the play was for the first time translated to English and performed at Kashinath Ghanekar auditorium in Thane.

A serial about Sane's mother and her childhood is running(as of 2023) called Yashoda - Goshta Shyamchya Aaichi.

Translation
Shyamchi Aai is available in English, translated by Aaditi Kulkarni, who is a Canadian national residing in Mississauga, Ontario. The publication ceremony of the English edition was held 22 May 2008 in Pune,  India.

"Shyamchi Aai" is available in Kannada, translated by Malati Mudakavi, a resident of Dharwad, India.

Another English translation by Shanta Gokhale has been published by Penguin Random House in their Puffin Classics series.  Publish date is January 18, 2021.

References

External links
 Book in Marathi Wikisource

Marathi-language literature
Indian autobiographies
Autobiographies adapted into films